The fourth season of Law & Order aired on NBC between September 15, 1993, and May 25, 1994. This is the final season to feature Michael Moriarty as Ben Stone. It is also the first season to include a shorter opening sequence and theme (at 46 seconds), which would be used for the remainder of the series' run. Season four was released on DVD December 6, 2005.

Cast
There were two cast changes from season 3:
 Anita Van Buren (played by S. Epatha Merkerson) replaced Don Cragen (Dann Florek) in the role of the detectives' supervisor (although Van Buren was a Lieutenant while Cragen had held the more senior rank of Captain)
 Claire Kincaid (played by Jill Hennessy) replaced Paul Robinette (Richard Brooks) as Assistant District Attorney.

This was the first time women played any of the Law & Orders six major characters:  both roles would continue to be occupied by women, with Merkerson remaining in the role of Van Buren, throughout the remainder of the series.  It was also the first time in Law & Order's history that two major cast changes were made simultaneously; the next such double change would not happen until the beginning of season 17.

Main Cast
 Jerry Orbach as Senior Detective Lennie Briscoe 
 Chris Noth as Junior Detective Mike Logan
 S. Epatha Merkerson as Lieutenant Anita Van Buren
 Michael Moriarty as Executive Assistant District Attorney Ben Stone
 Jill Hennessy as Assistant District Attorney Claire Kincaid
 Steven Hill as District Attorney Adam Schiff
 Carolyn McCormick as Dr. Elizabeth Olivet

Recurring Cast
During this season, J. K. Simmons who would later have a recurring role as Dr. Emil Skoda, appeared in the episode "Sanctuary" as a TV cameraman, Jerry Luppin.

Departure of Michael Moriarty
Michael Moriarty, who played Executive Assistant District Attorney Ben Stone, left the series at the end of the 4th season and was replaced by Sam Waterston as Executive Assistant District Attorney Jack McCoy from 1994 until the end of the series in 2010 before its revival.

Episodes

References

External links
 Episode guide from NBC.com

04
1993 American television seasons
1994 American television seasons